DE26 may refer to:
 Delaware Route 26
 ROCS Tai Chao (DE-26)